Lucio Battisti Vol. 2 is the second album by the Italian singer-songwriter Lucio Battisti. It was released in July 1970 by Dischi Ricordi.

It was only published as a compact cassette. It contains three songs from Battisti's first album ("Prigioniero del mondo", "Un’avventura" and "Nel sole, nel vento, nel sorriso e nel pianto") and various other songs that were released in a stereo version for the first time.

Track listing 
All lyrics written by Mogol; music by Battisti, except where indicated.
Side A
 "Fiori rosa, fiori di pesco" – 3:16
 "7 e 40" – 3:32
 "Acqua azzurra, acqua chiara" – 3:36
 "Prigioniero del mondo" – 3:26 (Mogol, Donida)
 "Dolce di giorno" – 2:38 (Mogol, Battisti, Angiolini)
 "Mi ritorni in mente"' – 3:41

Side B 
 "Il tempo di morire" – 5:40
 "Un'avventura" – 3:10
 "Dieci ragazze" – 2:54
 "Nel sole, nel vento, nel sorriso e nel pianto" – 2:45
 "Luisa Rossi" – 2:44 (Mogol, Battisti, Angiolini)
 "Era" – 2:56 (Mogol, Battisti, Angiolini)

Personnel 
 Lucio Battisti: voice, guitar
 Flavio Premoli – keyboards, piano
 Dario Baldan Bembo – keyboards, piano
 Demetrio Stratos – keyboards, piano
 Gabriele Lorenzi – keyboards, piano
 Mario Totaro – keyboards, piano
 Renato Angiolini – keyboards, piano
 Alberto Radius – guitar
 Franco Mussida – guitar
 Andrea Sacchi – guitar
 Damiano Dattoli – bass
 Angel Salvador – bass
 Giovanni Tommaso – bass
 Giorgio Piazza – bass
 Frank Laugelli – bass
 Gianni Dall'Aglio – drums
 Franz Di Cioccio – drums
 Leonello Bionda – drums
 Sergio Panno – drums
 Pietruccio Montalbetti – harmonica
 I 4+4 di Nora Orlandi – backing singers

References

External links 
 A web page containing information about this cassette album.

1970 albums
Lucio Battisti albums
Italian-language albums
Albums produced by Lucio Battisti